Lewis Yong Hwee Chua (born ) is a Singaporean male weightlifter, competing in the +105 kg category and representing Singapore at international competitions. He competed at world championships, most recently at the 2013 World Weightlifting Championships.

Chua qualified for the 2014 Commonwealth Games after lifting a total of 312kg at the Singapore National Open.

During the 2014 Commonwealth Games, Chua broke Singapore clean-and-jerk record of 180kg with 182kg. Chua lifted 133kg in the snatch, recording a total of 315kg total to be placed 10th.

Major results

References

1991 births
Living people
Singaporean male weightlifters
Place of birth missing (living people)
Weightlifters at the 2014 Commonwealth Games
Commonwealth Games competitors for Singapore
21st-century Singaporean people